The 32nd GLAAD Media Awards is the 2021 annual presentation of the GLAAD Media Awards, presented by GLAAD honoring the 2020 media season. It was held on April 8, 2021. The awards honor films, television shows, video games, musicians and works of journalism that fairly, accurately and inclusively represent the LGBT community and issues relevant to the community. GLAAD announced the 198 nominees split across 28 categories on January 28, 2021 on TikTok. A new category was created for Children's Programming, honoring televised works aired for younger children. The winners were announced in a virtual ceremony hosted by Niecy Nash. The show featured performances from Chika, Rebecca Black and Nash's wife Jessica Betts.

Winners and nominees 
The nominees were announced by Josie Totah, Shangela, and Jonathan Bennett on GLAAD's TikTok page on January 28, 2021. The winners were announced in a virtual ceremony on April 8, 2021, hosted by Niecy Nash.

Winners are listed first, highlighted in boldface, and indicated with a double dagger.

Film
{| class=wikitable
| style="vertical-align:top; width:50%;"|

 Happiest Season (Hulu) The Craft: Legacy (Sony Pictures)
 Ma Rainey's Black Bottom (Netflix)
 The Old Guard (Netflix)
 The Prom (Netflix)
| style="vertical-align:top; width:50%;"|

 The Boys in the Band (Netflix) Ammonite (Neon)
 And Then We Danced (Music Box Films)
 The Half of It (Netflix)
 I Carry You With Me (Sony Pictures Classics)
 Kajillionaire (Focus Features)
 The Life Ahead (Netflix)
 Lingua Franca (ARRAY)
 Monsoon (Strand Releasing)
 The True Adventures of Wolfboy (Vertical Entertainment)
|}

Television
{| class=wikitable
| style="vertical-align:top; width:50%;"|

 Schitt's Creek (Pop) Big Mouth (Netflix)
 Dead to Me (Netflix)
 Everything's Gonna Be Okay (Freeform)
 Harley Quinn (HBO Max)
 Love, Victor (Hulu)
 Saved by the Bell (Peacock)
 Sex Education (Netflix)
 Superstore (NBC)
 Twenties (BET)
| style="vertical-align:top; width:50%;"|

 Star Trek: Discovery (CBS All Access) 9-1-1: Lone Star (Fox)
 Killing Eve (BBC America)
 P-Valley (Starz)
 Ratched (Netflix)
 Supergirl (The CW)
 The Umbrella Academy (Netflix)
 Vida (Starz)
 The Wilds (Amazon)
 Wynonna Earp (Syfy)
|-
| style="vertical-align:top; width:50%;"|

 Uncle Frank (Amazon Studios) Alice Júnior (Netflix)
 Bad Education (HBO)
 The Christmas House (Hallmark Channel)
 The Christmas Setup (Lifetime)
 Dashing in December (Paramount Network)
 La Leyenda Negra (HBO Latino/HBO Max)
 The Thing About Harry (Freeform)
 Unpregnant (HBO Max)
 Your Name Engraved Herein (Netflix)
| style="vertical-align:top; width:50%;"|

 I May Destroy You (HBO) Dispatches from Elsewhere (AMC)
 The Haunting of Bly Manor (Netflix)
 Hollywood (Netflix)
 Little Fires Everywhere (Hulu)
|-
| style="vertical-align:top; width:50%;"|

 Disclosure (Netflix) Circus of Books (Netflix)
 Equal (HBO Max)
 For They Know Not What They Do (First Run Features)
 Howard (Disney+)
 Mucho Mucho Amor: The Legend of Walter Mercado (Netflix)
 Scream, Queen! My Nightmare on Elm Street (Virgil Films/Shudder)
 Visible: Out on Television (Apple TV+)
 We Are the Radical Monarchs (POV/PBS)
 Welcome to Chechnya (HBO)
| style="vertical-align:top; width:50%;"|

 We're Here (HBO) Deaf U (Netflix)
 Legendary (HBO Max)
 Queer Eye (Netflix)
 RuPaul's Drag Race (VH1)
|-
| style="vertical-align:top; width:50%;"|

 "Lilly Responds to Comments About Her Sexuality" – A Little Late with Lilly Singh (NBC) "Andy Cohen Calls for Change So He Can Donate His Plasma" – Watch What Happens Live with Andy Cohen (Bravo)
 "Black Trans Lives Matter" – Full Frontal with Samantha Bee (TBS)
 "Emily's Coming Out Story" – Red Table Talk: The Estefans (Facebook Watch)
 "Laverne Cox – Exploring Trans Representation with 'Disclosure'" – The Daily Show with Trevor Noah (Comedy Central)
| style="vertical-align:top; width:50%;"|

 Veneno (HBO Max) Ana (Amazon/Comedy Central/Pantaya)
 Élite (Netflix)
 #Luimelia (Atresplayer Premium)
 Someone Has to Die (Netflix)
|-
| style="vertical-align:top; width:50%;"|

 The Not-Too-Late Show with Elmo (HBO Max) "Challenge of the Senior Junior Woodchucks!" – DuckTales (Disney XD)
 "Dogbot" – Clifford the Big Red Dog (PBS)
 "Nancy Plays Dress Up" – Fancy Nancy (Disney Junior)
 Summer Camp Island (HBO Max)
| style="vertical-align:top; width:50%;"|

 First Day (Hulu) She-Ra and the Princesses of Power (DreamWorks Animation/Netflix) Craig of the Creek (Cartoon Network)
 Diary of a Future President (Disney+)
 Kipo and the Age of Wonderbeasts (Dreamworks Animation/Netflix)
 The Loud House (Nickelodeon)
 "Mary Anne Saves the Day" – The Baby-Sitters Club (Netflix)
 "Obsidian" – Adventure Time: Distant Lands (HBO Max)
 The Owl House (Disney Channel)
 Steven Universe (Cartoon Network)
|}

Journalism

Other
{| class="wikitable sortable"
|-
! Award
! Nominees
|-
! scope="row" |Outstanding Blog
|
 TransGriot
 Gays with Kids
 JoeMyGod
 Pittsburgh Lesbian Correspondents
 The Reckoning
|-
! scope="row" |Outstanding Comic Book
|
 Empyre, Lords of Empyre: Emperor Hulkling, Empyre: Aftermath Avengers, written by Al Ewing, Dan Slott, Chip Zdarsky, Anthony Oliveira (Marvel Comics) Far Sector, written by N.K. Jemisin (DC Comics)
 Guardians of the Galaxy, written by Al Ewing (Marvel Comics)
 Juliet Takes a Breath, written by Gabby Rivera (BOOM! Studios)
 Lois Lane, written by Greg Rucka (DC Comics)
 The Magic Fish, written by Trung Le Nguyen (Random House Graphic)
 Suicide Squad, written by Tom Taylor (DC Comics)
 Wynd, written by James Tynion IV (BOOM! Studios)
 X-Factor, written by Leah Williams (Marvel Comics)
 You Brought Me the Ocean, written by Alex Sanchez (DC Comics)
|-
! scope="row" |Outstanding Music Artist
|
 Sam Smith – Love Goes (Capitol)
 Adam Lambert – Velvet (More Is More/Empire)
 Brandy Clark – Your Life Is a Record (Warner Records)
 Halsey – Manic (Capitol)
 Kehlani – It Was Good Until It Wasn't (Atlantic)
 Lady Gaga – Chromatica (Streamline/Interscope)
 Miley Cyrus – Plastic Hearts (RCA)
 Pabllo Vittar – 111 (BMT/Sony Music Brasil)
 Peppermint – A Girl Like Me: Letters to My Lovers (Producer Entertainment Group)
 Ricky Martin – Pausa (Sony Latin)
|-
! scope="row" |Outstanding Breakthrough Music Artist
|
 Chika – Industry Games (Warner Records)
 Arca – KiCk i (XL)
 FLETCHER – The (S)ex Tapes (Capitol)
 Keiynan Lonsdale – Rainbow Boy (Keiynan Lonsdale)
 Kidd Kenn – Child's Play (Island Records)
 Orville Peck – Show Pony (Columbia/Sub Pop)
 Phoebe Bridgers – Punisher (Dead Oceans)
 Rina Sawayama – Sawayama (Dirty Hit/Avex Trax)
 Trixie Mattel – Barbara (Producer Entertainment Group/ATO Records)
 Victoria Monét – Jaguar (Tribe Records)
|-
! scope="row" |Outstanding Video Game
|
 'The Last of Us Part II (Sony Interactive Entertainment) Tell Me Why (Xbox Game Studios)' Assassin's Creed Valhalla (Ubisoft)
 Borderlands 3: Guns, Love, and Tentacles (2K Games)
 Bugsnax (Young Horses)
 Hades (Supergiant Games)
 If Found... (Annapurna Interactive)
 Ikenfell (Humble Games)
 Immortals Fenyx Rising (Ubisoft)
 World of Warcraft: Shadowlands (Blizzard Entertainment)
|}

 Special Recognition 
 After Forever (Amazon)
 New Hollywood (Deadline)
 Happiest Season Soundtrack (Facet/Warner Records)
 Noah's Arc: The 'Rona Chronicles (Patrik Ian-Polk Entertainment)
 Out (Pixar/Disney+)
 Razor Tongue (YouTube)
 "The Son" – Little America'' (Apple TV+)

References 

GLAAD Media Awards ceremonies
GLAAD
2021 in LGBT history